Mario is a fictional character created by Nintendo.

Mario may also refer to:
 Mario (given name), a given name (and a list of people with the name)

Film and television
 Mario (1984 film), a Canadian drama film
 Mario (2018 film), a Swiss film
 Mario (Austrian TV series), a 1963 television series
 Mario (Italian sitcom), a 2013 television sitcom series

Music
 Giovanni Matteo Mario (1810–1883), Italian opera singer
 Mario Caldato Jr. (born 1961), American record producer 
 "Mario" (song), a 1985 song by Franco Luambo and the TPOK Jazz]
 Mario (singer) (born 1986)
 Mario (album), a 2002 album by Mario
 "Mario (Your Own Way to Paradise)", a 1983 song by Bow Wow Wow from When the Going Gets Tough, The Tough Get Going

Other uses 
 Mario (franchise), various media by Nintendo featuring the character Mario
 Monte Mario, a hill in Rome, Italy
 12931 Mario, an asteroid
 Tropical Storm Mario, a list of storms with the name
  Mario, codename for one of the builds on ChromeOS

See also 
 

 List of Mario television series, list of television series that star the video game character Mario
 Mari0, a fan-made parody game that combines Super Mario Bros and Portal
 Maria (disambiguation)
 Marius (disambiguation)
 Super Mario
 Super Mario Man, later stage name for professional wrestler Ray Candy